Urmi may refer to:

 Urmi, also spelled Oormi, means ocean in Sanskrit and also a name of Vyuha formation in Hindu epic Mahabharata 
 Urmi (river), in Khabarovsk Krai, Russia
 Urmi, Estonia, a village in Palupera Parish, Valga County, Estonia
 Urmia, a city in Iranian Azerbaijan 
 Lake Urmia, a salt lake near the city  
 Urmi Juvekar, Indian filmmaker

See also 
 Urumi (disambiguation)